is a 2012 Japanese omnibus film directed by Mikihiro Endō, Issei Matsui, and Yūichirō Sakashita. In 2017, this film was nominated for International Emmy Awards in Comedy.

Cast
"Before After"
 Yumika Tajima as Karuho Hayashida
 Takuma Oto'o as Karuho's boss
 Shigeru Saiki as Karuho's father

"Life Rate"
 Takayuki Yamada as a man dealt with Death
 Ken Yasuda as Death
 Tsubasa Honda as a woman aspiring a writer

"Sarugoke ha Tsuraiyo"
 Takako Katou as a movie producer
 Shigeyuki Totsugi as a movie director
 Kenji Murakami

References

External links
  
 
 らくごえいが (2013) at allcinema (in Japanese)
 らくごえいが at KINENOTE (in Japanese)

2012 films
2010s Japanese films
2010s Japanese-language films